The Sartiș is a right tributary of the river Beliu in Romania. Formerly a right tributary of the Teuz, its flow was intercepted by the canalized lower course of the Beliu near Cermei in 1914–1919. Its disconnected lower course continues towards the Teuz near Mișca.

References

Rivers of Romania
Rivers of Arad County